OpenLearning Limited (OLL) is an ASX-listed educational technology company based in Australia that offers a social online learning platform that can deliver massive open online courses (MOOCs), short courses and online degrees.

History 
OpenLearning has worked with the University of New South Wales and Taylor's University to deliver the first MOOCs in Australia and Malaysia respectively.

In December 2013, OpenLearning launched a cloud based software product for companies to create private educational portals on its platform.

In September 2014, the Malaysian Ministry of Higher Education selected OpenLearning as the national Massive Open Online Course (MOOC) platform for public universities. In September 2018, OpenLearning announced that it had worked with 20 public universities, 10 private universities and 34 polytechnics in Malaysia to deliver over 800 courses to 600,000 students.

In February 2015, OpenLearning raised $1.7 million in funding led by angel investor Clive Mayhew. ASX-listed ICS Global, Robin and Susan Yandle, and Hideaki Fukutake, the director of Japanese education company Benesse Holdings.

In June 2015, the Australian Federal Government announced it would be getting its first MOOC delivered by OpenLearning.

By late 2019, OpenLearning began providing its platform to universities and colleges on a software-as-a-service model and announced that it had established partnerships University of NSW, the University of Melbourne, Charles Sturt University, University of Technology Sydney, the University of New England, the University of Newcastle and Macquarie University.

In October 2019, OpenLearning announced its intention to pursue a listing on the Australian Stock Exchange.

See also
 Open learning

References

External links 
 

Educational technology companies of Australia
Internet properties established in 2012
Virtual learning environments
Learning management systems
Australian educational websites